Phryneta obliquata is a species of beetle in the family Cerambycidae. It was described by Harold in 1878. It is known from Tanzania, Uganda, Somalia, the Democratic Republic of the Congo, Ethiopia and Kenya.

References

Phrynetini
Beetles described in 1878